Hyalospectra is a genus of moths belonging to the subfamily Drepaninae.

Species
 Hyalospectra altipustularia Holloway, 1998
 Hyalospectra diaphana Warren, 1922
 Hyalospectra dierli Holloway, 1998
 Hyalospectra grisea Warren, 1906
 Hyalospectra labi Holloway, 1998
 Hyalospectra pustularia (Walker, 1861)

Former species
 Hyalospectra arizana Wileman, 1911
 Hyalospectra hyalinata Moore, 1867

References

Drepaninae
Drepanidae genera